Massha may refer to:

 Massha (shrine), a small Japanese shrines entrusted to the care of a larger shrine
 Massha, a character in Robert Asprin's MythAdventures